SaS group Tower (formerly: SHD Komes) is a high-rise in Most, Czech Republic. With a height of 96 metres it is the tallest building in Ústí nad Labem Region and the fourth tallest building in the Czech Republic. Construction of the building commenced in 1977 and finished in 1984. The building was used as the headquarters of Severočeské hnědouhelné doly. This company was one of the largest producers of brown coal in Czechoslovakia. After 1989, SD-Comes a.s. became the new owner of the building. In 2012, the owner SD - KOMES a.s. sold the building for CZK 73.5 million to SaS ENERGO s.r.o.

References

External links 
 SD - KOMES website
 
 

Skyscraper office buildings in the Czech Republic
Buildings and structures in Most (city)
1984 establishments in Czechoslovakia
20th-century architecture in the Czech Republic